Sahara Club- Pokhara is a social welfare organization established in 1998. It works to enhance the standard of Nepalese  football by running a social football academy in Pokhara. The academy assembles street boys and orphans from different districts of Nepal. The club is unique as it has been successful in highlighting the causes it stands for by using the most sought out game football.

Sahara Academy
The academy is the main highlight of the club shaping the lives of more than 30 children. Sahara Club academy is in Dobilla, Pokhara which covers 26 ropanees of land. The academy has an academy building with necessary facilities and a football ground. Giving children football training with proper education and shelter. The club has to depend upon its yearly Football Tournament Aaha Gold Cup. The profit, which comes after completion of tournament will directly, goes to the fund of Academy. 
The club also receives donation for these purpose mainly from NRN(Nepali) residing in UK, foreigners and other organizations. The most notable product from the club is the national Striker Anil Gurung. The academy is the first football academy to be run by a club itself in Nepal.

Public Health and Environment Program of Sahara Club

Public Toilet

At the entry to the Pokhara bus park this club has made a public toilet to keep the cityclean. The money collection from this toilet has become the source to run administration of the club and maintenance of the Public Toilet.

Public Health Centre
In past, it started with one public health centre, but this program cannot get continuity. The reason lack of laboratory equipment and due to financial commitment but still planning to continue same program in future.

Aaha Rara Gold Cup
Formerly known as Caravan Gold Cup in 2058 B.S. and Aaha Gold Cup till 2068 B.S. it was later renamed to Aaha ! Rara Gold Cup since 2069 the tournament has been hosted as must win cup in recent history. This tournament is supported by ANFA and is included in its yearly calendar. The cup is organized regularly since 2002 A.D. The current defending champion is Nepal A.P.F Club This is the 1st Aaha! Rara Gold Cup title for A.P.F .

See also
Football in Nepal

References

External links
Official Site https://web.archive.org/web/20100123025814/http://www.saharaclub.com.np/

Football clubs in Nepal
1998 establishments in Nepal
Sport in Pokhara